The 1934 Claxton Shield was the first annual Claxton Shield, an Australian national baseball tournament. It was held at the Adelaide Oval and Hindmarsh Oval in Adelaide from 5 to 12 August, and was won by the hosts South Australia. The other participating teams were New South Wales and Victoria.

The tournament was the first of what would be an ongoing series of regular national tournaments. Prior to 1934, there had been interstate tournaments, where one state would host only one of the others for a series of games, and there had been two national tournaments, the first in 1910 with New South Wales, Tasmania and Victoria, the second in 1912 which also included South Australia, both of which were won by New South Wales. Though the specifics of the tournament's format would change over the years, with the exception of the suspension due to World War II, the tournament would continue through to 1988 as the highest level of baseball in the country.

Format
Each team met each other team twice over the course of the week. In each game, two competition points were on offer to the teams. The points were awarded as follows:
 Win – two points
 Tie – one point
 Loss – no points
At the end of the tournament, the team with the most points was declared the winner, and awarded the Claxton Shield. As there was a tie between New South Wales and Victoria for second place at the end of the tournament, their net for and against was used to split them, hence New South Wales finishing second.

Results

References

Bibliography
 
 

Claxton Shield
Claxton Shield
Claxton Shield
1930s in Adelaide
Claxton Shield